Chile Chico Airport ,  is an airport serving Chile Chico, a lakeside town in the Aysén Region of Chile.

There is rising terrain west of the airport.

See also

Transport in Chile
List of airports in Chile

References

External links
Chile Chico Airport at OpenStreetMap

Chile Chico Airport at FallingRain

Airports in Aysén Region